The Next Indian general election in Tamil Nadu will be held in or before May 2024 to elect the 40 members of 18th Lok Sabha.

Parties and alliances





Others

References

Tamil Nadu
Indian general elections in Tamil Nadu